Limnocytheridae is a family of ostracods, containing the following genera:
Cytheridella Daday, 1905
Gomphocythere Sars, 1924
Leptocytheromorpha Purper, 1979†
Limnocythere Brady, 1968
Minicythere Ornellas, 1974

References

External links
 

 
Ostracod families